Padippura is a Malayalam word that may refer to:

 Padippura (:ml:പടിപ്പുര), a traditional arched gateway (sometimes, without a lockable gate) on a path leading to the main building, as per Kerala Architecture
 Pazhoor Padipura, a place of astrological importance and linked to Pazhoor Perumthrikkovil temple, located near Piravom, Kerala